In music, Op. 101 stands for Opus number 101. Compositions that are assigned this number include:

 Beethoven – Piano Sonata No. 28
 Brahms – Piano Trio No. 3
 Dvořák – Humoresques
 Schumann – Minnespiel (4 songs, 2 duets, 2 quartets)
 Shostakovich – String Quartet No. 6
 Strauss – Mephistos Höllenrufe